Alexandria Boukephala and Alexandria Nikaia were two cities founded by Alexander the Great during his invasion of the Indian subcontinent. Two of many cities founded by the Macedonian king, the cities were founded on either side of the Hydaspes (Jhelum River), east of the Indus River. Boukephala was founded in memory of Alexander's beloved horse Bucephalus who had died after the Battle of the Hydaspes in 326 BC, while Nikaia was founded in celebration of that victory.

History
After successfully capturing Aornos (in present-day northern Pakistan) in April 326 BC, Alexander the Great crossed the Indus river to begin campaigning in northern India. 

A reference to Alexandria Bucephalus may appear in the Mūlasarvāstivāda Vinaya, a Buddhist text of the early centuries AD. This text refers to two cities called Ādirājya ("Place of the First Kingship") and Bhadrāśva ("Place of the Good Horse") located on the Vitastā (i.e., Hydaspes) River along the road from Gandhāra to Mathurā. The Buddhists attributed these two cities to the mythical king Mahāsammata, but some modern scholars propose to identify them as the two cities founded by Alexander the Great, Nicaea and Bucephala.

References

Citations

Sources
 

 
 
 

Phalia
Cities founded by Alexander the Great
Populated places established in the 4th century BC
320s BC establishments
Former populated places in Pakistan
Jhelum
Bactrian and Indian Hellenistic period
Populated places along the Silk Road